Coosa is an unincorporated community in Leake County, in the U.S. state of Mississippi.

History
Coosa is a name most likely derived from the Choctaw language; it's purported to mean "reed brake". A post office called Coosa was established in 1879, and remained in operation until 1904.

References

Unincorporated communities in Mississippi
Unincorporated communities in Leake County, Mississippi
Mississippi placenames of Native American origin